Karlo Matković (born 30 March 2001) is a Croatian professional basketball player for Cedevita Olimpija of the ABA League. He represents the Croatia national team internationally.

Early career 
In 2017, Matković participated in the Jordan Brand Classic camp. In August 2018, he participated at the Basketball Without Borders Europe camp in Belgrade, Serbia, representing Bosnia and Herzegovina.

Professional career 
During the 2018–19 Croatian League season, Matković was promoted to the Cedevita senior team. In April 2019, he signed his first professional contract for Cedevita. In September 2019, he was loaned to OKK Beograd for the 2019–20 Serbian League season. In August 2020, he was loaned to Mega Soccerbet for the 2020–21 ABA season. Following the 2020–21 season Matković declared for the 2021 NBA draft. On July 19, 2021, he withdrew his name from consideration for the 2021 NBA draft.

In July 2022, Matković joined the New Orleans Pelicans for the NBA Summer League. On 23 July 2022, he joined Cedevita Olimpija.

NBA draft rights 
In April 2022, Matković declared for the 2022 NBA draft. He was selected with the 52nd overall pick by the New Orleans Pelicans in the 2022 NBA Draft. Following the draft, it was reported that Matković will not join the Pelicans roster for the 2022–23 NBA season.

National team career

Bosnia and Herzegovina 
Matković was a member of the Bosnia and Herzegovina under-18 team at the 2018 FIBA U18 European Championship in Latvia. Over seven tournament games, he averaged 8.6 points, 6.3 rebounds and 2.1 assists per game. His team finished the last at the tournament with a 0–7 record.

Croatia 
In November 2021, Matković expressed his interest to represent Croatia internationally in the senior competitions, if called. He made his debut for Croatia in February 2022, in the 2023 FIBA World Cup Qualifiers match against Sweden.

See also
 List of NBA drafted players from Serbia

References

External links 
 Karlo Matkovic at aba-liga.com
 Karlo Matkovic at realgm.com

2001 births
Living people
ABA League players
Basketball League of Serbia players
Bosnia and Herzegovina expatriate basketball people in Serbia
Bosnia and Herzegovina men's basketball players
Centers (basketball)
Croatian expatriate basketball people in Serbia
Croatian men's basketball players
Croats of Bosnia and Herzegovina
KK Cedevita players
KK Cedevita Olimpija players
KK Mega Basket players
New Orleans Pelicans draft picks
OKK Beograd players
Power forwards (basketball)
Sportspeople from Livno